Máel Sechnaill Ó Braonáin (fl. 1581–1585) was an Irish harper.

Ó Braonáin is listed in the fiants in 1581 as Mac Loughlin roe O’Brennan, County Galway, and in 1585 as Melaghlin roe O’Brennan, County Galway. He is one of the last harpers to be named in late medieval Connacht.

It is unknown if he was of the same family as Donnchad Clereach Ó Maol Braonáin (cleric and musician, died 1343).

External links
 http://billhaneman.ie/IMM/IMM-II.html

Musicians from County Galway
16th-century Irish musicians
Irish harpists
Year of death unknown
Year of birth unknown